Mike Bullard may refer to:

Mike Bullard (ice hockey) (born 1961), ice hockey player from Ottawa, Canada
Mike Bullard (comedian) (born 1957), Canadian comedian, radio and television host